Punishment is the third studio album released by American hardcore band Endwell. Punishment was released on April 26, 2011 and is the band's second studio album release after signing with Mediaskare Records. Endwell has stated that there was a black metal influence on this album, noticeable on tracks such as "Dark Waves", "Plague Wielders", and "Fractal Gloom".

Track listing 
 "Greater Haste"
 "Anxiety Bath" (feat Frankie Palmeri)
 "Depression Party" (feat JJ Peters)
 "Dark Waves" (feat Mean Pete)
 "Forgotten Wolves"
 "Mason Lamps"
 "High Friends in Low Places" (feat Phil Vibez)
 "Living Reverie"
 "Black Horns"
 "Negative Pressure
 "Plague Wielders" (feat Sean Bennett)
 "Laments"
 "Fractal Gloom"

Personnel 
 Sean Murphy – vocals
 Danny Pupplo – guitar
 Matt Rogers – guitar
 Pieter VanDenberg - bass
 Mike Sciulara – drums
 Steve Evetts - mixing
 Alan Douches - mastering
 Sean Murphy & Danny Pupplo - production

2011 albums
Endwell (band) albums